South Hill Mall is an enclosed, super-regional shopping mall located in Puyallup, Washington, United States. The mall also includes five anchor stores (two JCPenney stores, Macy's, Target, and Dick's Sporting Goods), as well as DSW, Old Navy, and Regal Cinemas. The mall is managed by Cafaro Company of Youngstown, Ohio.

History

Construction of the South Hill Mall began in October 1987 at the junction of State Route 512 and Meridian Avenue in southern Puyallup. Its first retailers opened on July 20, which was followed by a formal grand opening on May 12, 1989. At the time, the mall included only three anchors, all discount retailers: Mervyns, Lamonts and Target. Office Max (now DSW) and Old Navy were later added as well.

Lamonts was converted to Gottschalks in 2000 when the Lamonts chain was acquired. The Bon Marché was dual-branded as Bon-Macy's in 2003, and then was renamed as just Macy's in 2005, the same year that Gottschalks closed most of the former Lamonts stores. Within a year of its closing, the former Gottschalks anchor was split between Circuit City and Linens 'n Things. Mervyns closed in 2006 as the chain exited Washington. By May of the same year, it was announced that Kohl's, a chain based in Wisconsin, had acquired the former Mervyns store, although the mall's manager later said that Kohl's had no plans to open a store in the mall. A multimillion-dollar renovation of the mall also began in 2009, starting with a renovation of the food court. In addition, JCPenney moved its women's departments to the former Mervyns, while retaining all other departments in the existing store. Dick's Sporting Goods opened its first Washington state location in April 2010, replacing the spaces vacated by Circuit City and Linens 'n Things.

On October 15, 2018, it was announced that Sears would be closing as part of a plan to close 142 stores nationwide. As of 2022, the former Sears location has been converted to a Round 1 entertainment center.

References

External links
Official website

Shopping malls established in 1988
Shopping malls in Pierce County, Washington
Puyallup, Washington
Cafaro Company
1988 establishments in Washington (state)